A marketing decision support system (sometimes abbreviated MKDSS) is a decision support system for marketing activity. The system is used to help businesses explore different scenarios by manipulating already collected data from the past events. It consists of information technology, marketing data, systems tools, and modeling capabilities that enable it to provide predicted outcomes from different scenario and marketing strategies. MKDSS assists decision makers in different scenarios and can be a very helpful tool for a business to take over their competitors.

Example 
A MKDSS is used to support the software vendors’ planning strategy for marketing products.  It can help to identify advantageous levels of pricing, advertising spending, and advertising copy for the firm’s products. This helps determine the firm's marketing mix for product software.

Decision support systems  
The concepts involved in decision support systems were first expressed in the early 1970s by Scott Morton. These systems are used to help solve complex problems by using computer technology and can help businesses with decision making. DSS has progressed since it was first developed in the 70's. The main areas of research that DDS has developed from are theoretical and technological.

There are three types of DSS available: 1. available as a software application, 2. bespoke and 3. user-developed.

DSS have many tools that contain different functions such as; sophisticated database management capabilities with access to internal and external data. information, and knowledge; powerful modeling functions accessed by a model management system; powerful, yet simple user interface designs that enable interactive queries, reporting, and graphing functions.

Although DSS have many different functions, they are very user friendly and easy to use, flexible and have strong graphic capabilities.

Use of decision support systems 
DSS are used mainly used before a company invests their money into something. One of DSS's biggest benefits is its ability to predict the outcome of different scenarios, it can help businesses to save money by preventing failures and put them towards a better cause.

Decision support systems can help businesses to save time as well. They would not have to waste even a minute in planning and trying to create something which is not going to succeed.

Satisfaction 
MDSS would totally satisfy marketing businesses as it would improve the effectiveness of decision making, reduce costs by eliminating completely unsuitable and useless decisions.

DSS helps and improves the performance of decision makers by using a computer system.

One of the most important and useful things about a system like this is that it lets the business look forward instead of being stuck and trying to examine the past to get answers to complex questions.

References 

Method engineering
Marketing software